Gasht-e Rudkhan (also Romanized as Gasht-e Rūdkhān and Gasht Rūdkhān; also known as Keshter-Khan) is a village in Gurab Pas Rural District, in the Central District of Fuman County, Gilan Province, Iran. At the 2006 census, its population was 787, in 202 families.

References 

Populated places in Fuman County